Cimolus vitticeps is a species of leaf-footed bug in the family Coreidae. It was first described by Stål in 1870 and is found in Panama, Costa Rica, Nicaragua and Mexico.

References

Coreini
Insects described in 1862